René Gardi (1 March 1909 - 9 March 2000) was a Swiss traveller and author. He wrote particularly on the handicrafts and architecture of West Africa.

Gardi was born 1909 in Bern, Switzerland. After studying mathematics, physics, and zoology at Bern University, he became  Sekundarlehrer at Brügg BE near Biel from 1931 to 1945, and then worked as independent author and traveler (Vortragsreisender). He documented his travels to Africa in several books and in two films:
Mandara (1959) and
 Die letzte Karawane (The Last Caravan) (1967).
	
He won many prizes for literature and in  1967 received an Honorary Doctorate at Bern University.

Gardi died 2000 in Bern.

Publications 
Schwarzwasser, Jugendbuch 1943
Bergvolk der Wüste, 1951
Blaue Schleier - rote Zelte, 1951
Mandara, 1953
Kirdi, 1955
Sepik, 1958
Sahara, 1967

External links

1909 births
2000 deaths
Swiss writers